Elsa Maria Sylvestersson (11 August 1924 Turku, Finland – 9 November 1996 Helsinki, Finland) was a Finnish ballet dancer and choreographer.

Sylvestersson was born to a Russian mother and a Swedish-speaking Finnish father. She danced as soloist in ballet at the age of 14. As a dancer, her most famous roles included Odette-Odile in Swan Lake, and the Firebird in The Firebird. She was technically talented and thus well suited for the  roles in character dance.

As a choreographer she was very productive and had a long career (from 1954 to 1984). Her style was eclectic, and she had no trouble in combining moves from classical ballet and modern dance. She was the first one to prepare choreographies for Finnish television. In 1959 she made The Red Room based on August Strindberg, and later Selli (The Cell), Häkki (The Cage) and Sudenmorsian  (The Wolf's Bride).

References

External links 
 https://www.imdb.com/name/nm0843262/

1924 births
1996 deaths
People from Turku
Finnish female dancers
Finnish choreographers
Finnish people of Russian descent